The town of Huiyuan is located within Huocheng County, in the Ili Kazakh Autonomous Prefecture, Xinjiang, China. , Huiyuan's population was reported as 20,564.

Between 1762 and 1866 the Huiyuan Fortress or Huiyuan City (Huìyuǎn Chéng), the center of the Chinese authority in Xinjiang was located within the southern area of the modern Huiyuan town.

History

Qing dynasty 
Once part of the Dzungar Khanate, this area was annexed by the Manchus in the 1750s. The Old Huiyuan fort was built in 1764 during the reign of the Qianlong Emperor after the Revolt of the Altishahr Khojas. It acted as the center of Manchu military power and civilian administration in Xinjiang.

Huiyuan suffered severe damage during the Muslim Rebellion of the 1860s. Besieged in his palace, the then General of Ili, Mingsioi, blew himself up  rather than surrender to the rebels. The fort was completely destroyed during the Russian occupation that followed in 1871-81.

The headquarter of the General of Ili moved back to the new Huiyuan fort in 1894 after the construction completed.

While the city of Yining (originally known as Níngyuǎn Chéng) has remained the commercial center of the region, the 19th century Huiyuan, like its successor Suiding, was mostly a fortress and an administrative town. Huiyuan was known to the Russians and Westerners as the New Kuldja, Chinese Kuldja, Manchu Kuldja, or Ili, to distinguish it from Yining (the Old Kuldja or the Taranchi Kuldja).

Present 
James Millward, writing in 1998, said that the only surviving remains of the Qing era structures were a drum tower and a section of the wall that used to enclose the Jiangjun's yamen. However, it has been reported that some of the Qing period buildings, including a bell tower and a "Governor General's Pavilion", have since been rebuilt at the site of the 1882 new Huiyuan fort as a tourist attraction, often referred to as the "Ancient Huiyuan Town", not to be confused with the site of the old Huiyuan fort.

Notes

References 
 Huocheng County information, at the China Administrative Division info site 
 伊犁惠远城 (Ili's Huiyuan City)  
 Henry Lansdell, "Russian Central Asia: Including Kuldja, Bokhara, Khiva and Merv". Full text available at Google Books; there is also a 2001 facsimile reprint of the 1885 edition, . (Chapters XIV-XVII describe Lansdell visit to the area in the early 1880s, soon after the Russian withdrawal. He visited "Suidun" (Suiding), mentioned the already ruined "Ili or Manchu Kuldja" (Huiyuancheng), and then went to "Taranchi Kuldja" (Yining))

Populated places in Xinjiang
1762 establishments in China